Tama Maru No. 7 (Japanese:  第七玉丸 ) was an auxiliary minesweeper of the Imperial Japanese Navy during World War II. She was later reclassified as a submarine chaser.

History
Tama Maru No. 7 was laid down on 1 March 1936 at the shipyard of Fujinagata Zosensho at the behest of shipping company, Taiyo Hogei. She was launched on 22 July 1936 and completed 1 September 1936. On 11 April 1941, she was requisitioned by the Imperial Japanese Navy and converted to an auxiliary minesweeper under Reserve Lieutenant (Junior Grade) Fujita Yoshinao (藤田義直). Fujita served until 20 April 1943 when he was replaced by Reserve Lieutenant Koga Shunji (古賀春次). On 10 May 1944, she was reclassified as a submarine chaser. She was sunk on 18 June 1944 and struck from the Navy list on 10 August 1944.

References

1936 ships
Ships built by Fujinagata Shipyards
Maritime incidents in June 1944
World War II minesweepers of Japan
Mine warfare vessels of the Imperial Japanese Navy
Auxiliary ships of the Imperial Japanese Navy